Don Clayton Perdue (born November 12, 1949 in Kenova, West Virginia) is an American politician and a Democratic member of the West Virginia House of Delegates representing District 19 since January 12, 2013. Perdue served consecutively from January 1999 until January 2013 in the District 18 and District 17 seats.

Education
Perdue earned his BS in chemistry from Marshall University and his BS in pharmacy from Ohio Northern University.

Elections
2012 Redistricted to District 19 with fellow District 17 incumbent Rick Thompson, Perdue placed second in the May 8, 2012 Democratic Primary with 3,088 votes (46.6%), and placed second in the three-way two-position November 6, 2012 General election with 6,817 votes (36.4%) behind incumbent Representative Thompson (D) and ahead of Republican nominee Randy Tomblin.
1994 Perdue initially ran unsuccessfully for the West Virginia House of Delegates in 1994.
1998 Perdue was initially elected in the open District 18 seat in the five-way 1998 Democratic Primary and the November 3, 1998 General election.
2000 Perdue was unopposed for both the 2000 Democratic Primary and the November 7, 2000 General election.
2002 Redistricted to District 17 alongside its previous sole incumbent Rick Thompson, Perdue and Thompson were challenged in the 2002 Democratic Primary and were both re-elected in the three-way two-position November 5, 2002 General election.
2004 Perdue and Representative Thompson were unopposed for the 2004 Democratic Primary, and were re-elected in the four-way two-position November 2, 2004 General election.
2006 Perdue and Representative Thompson were unopposed for the 2006 Democratic Primary and were re-elected in the three-way two-position November 7, 2006 General election against Republican nominee Luiza Peana.
2008 Perdue and Representative Thompson and returning Republican challenger Luiza Peana were all unopposed for their May 13, 2008 primaries, setting up a rematch; Perdue placed second in the three-way two-position November 4, 2008 General election with 7,121 votes (35.9%) behind incumbent Thompson and ahead of Peana.
2010 Perdue and Representative Thompson were unopposed for both the May 11, 2010 Democratic Primary where Perdue placed second with 2,664 votes (47.2%), and the November 2, 2010 General election where Perdue placed second with 5,909 votes (47.6%) behind Representative Thompson.

References

External links
Official page at the West Virginia Legislature

Don Perdue at Ballotpedia
Don C. Perdue at OpenSecrets

1949 births
Living people
Marshall University alumni
Democratic Party members of the West Virginia House of Delegates
Ohio Northern University alumni
People from Kenova, West Virginia
21st-century American politicians